Balakhivka is an urban-type settlement in Oleksandriia Raion of Kirovohrad Oblast in Ukraine. It is located on the left bank of the Inhulets, a right tributary of the Dnieper. Balakhivka belongs to Petrove settlement hromada, one of the hromadas of Ukraine. Population: 

Until 18 July 2020, Balakhivka belonged to Petrove Raion. The raion was abolished in July 2020 as part of the administrative reform of Ukraine, which reduced the number of raions of Kirovohrad Oblast to four. The area of Petrove Raion was merged into Oleksandriia Raion.

Economy

Transportation
Balakhivka is connected by road with Oleksandriia and Kryvyi Rih, where it has further access to the highway network of Ukraine.

References

Urban-type settlements in Oleksandriia Raion